Cherith Baldry (born 21 January 1947) is a British children's fiction and fantasy fiction writer. She also publishes under the pseudonyms Adam Blade, Jenny Dale, Jack Dillon, and Erin Hunter.

Biography
Born in Lancaster, England, Baldry studied at Manchester University and St Anne's College, Oxford. She worked both as a teacher and a lecturer.

Baldry is one of seven authors who writes under the pen name of Erin Hunter. Baldry has written for Warriors, in which wild cats strive for peace in their territories, and Seekers, in which a group of four bears go on journeys together.

She currently lives in Reigate with her two cats, Bramble and Sorrel, who were the inspirations for two characters in the Warriors books (Bramblestar and Sorreltail, respectively). She was married to the late Peter Baldry, a scientist, and has two sons, Will and Adam.

Books

Eaglesmount trilogy
The Silver Horn (2001)
The Emerald Throne (2001)
The Lake of Darkness (2004)

Abbey series
The Buried Cross (2004)
The Silent Man (2004)
The Scarlet Spring (2004)
The Drowned Sword (2006)

Saga of the Six Worlds series
The Book and the Phoenix (1989)  A Rush of Golden Wings and revised as Cradoc's Quest (1994)
Hostage of the Sea (1990)  Rite of Brotherhood
The Carpenter's Apprentice (1992)
Storm Wind (1994)

Warriors series

Forest of Secrets
A Dangerous Path
The Darkest Hour
Firestar's Quest
Midnight
Moonrise
Starlight
Twilight
Sunset
Outcast
Long Shadows
Sunrise
Bramblestar's Storm
Shattered Sky
Lost Stars
Veil of Shadows
The Place of No Stars
River

Seekers series

Great Bear Lake
The Last Wilderness
Spirits in the Stars
Island of Shadows

Novels
Drew's Talents (1997)
Mutiny in Space (1997)
Exiled from Camelot (2000)
The Reliquary Ring (2002)
The Roses of Roazon (2004)

References

External links
 Cherith Baldry at Fantastic Fiction
 
 
 Adam Blade , Jenny Dale , Jack Dillon , Erin Hunter (shared pseudonyms) at LC Authorities with 36, 46, 0, and 79 records

1947 births
Living people
English children's writers
English fantasy writers
Warriors (novel series)
People from Lancaster, Lancashire
People from Reigate
English women novelists
20th-century English women writers
20th-century English writers
21st-century English women writers
Women science fiction and fantasy writers
20th-century British short story writers
21st-century British short story writers